Murugummi is a small village is located in the taluk of Pedacherlopalle,  Prakasam district of Andhrapradesh, India.

References

Villages in Prakasam district